Singanallur is a railway station in the city of coimbatore.

Coimbatore Suburban Railway
Coimbatore Suburban Railway is a circular suburban railway planned for coimbatore city. The circular railway line will help run through Coimbatore Junction, Podanur, Vellalore, Irugur, Singanallur, Peelamedu and Coimbatore North. This will certainly help decongest the city roads.

Connectivity
The Singanallur railway station is connected to Gandhipuram Central Bus Terminus which is about 14 km, Ukkadam Bus Terminus is about 10.3 km, Saibaba Colony Bus Terminus is about 14 km, Coimbatore Junction railway station is about 9.9 km and Coimbatore International Airport is about 4.6 km.

See also

Railway stations in Coimbatore
Salem railway division
Coimbatore
Indian Railways
Transport in Coimbatore

References

External links
 The official website of Southern railway

Railway junction stations in Tamil Nadu
Railway stations in Coimbatore
Salem railway division